Hikuai is a small community on the Tairua River near the base of the Coromandel Peninsula in the North Island of New Zealand. It is a tourist hot spot at times such as New Zealand Labour Day weekend, the Christmas and New Year holiday, and especially when Tairua and Pauanui are busy.

It is prone to heavy precipitation and floods (accelerated by the nearby Tairua River) which occasionally causes impassibility. The cellphone and electricity coverage is patchy but is intact. It has a large colonial and gold mining history making it a special place to explore. Various adventure operators exist and they provide an interesting glance at history and lifestyle.

Demographics
Hikuai statistical area covers an area of the east coast of the Coromandel Peninsula which surrounds but does not include Tairua and Pauanui.

Hikuai statistical area had a population of 237 at the 2018 New Zealand census, an increase of 18 people (8.2%) since the 2013 census, and an increase of 6 people (2.6%) since the 2006 census. There were 84 households, comprising 117 males and 120 females, giving a sex ratio of 0.97 males per female. The median age was 47.0 years (compared with 37.4 years nationally), with 42 people (17.7%) aged under 15 years, 33 (13.9%) aged 15 to 29, 114 (48.1%) aged 30 to 64, and 42 (17.7%) aged 65 or older.

Ethnicities were 94.9% European/Pākehā, 19.0% Māori, 3.8% Pacific peoples, and 2.5% other ethnicities. People may identify with more than one ethnicity.

The percentage of people born overseas was 11.4, compared with 27.1% nationally.

Although some people chose not to answer the census's question about religious affiliation, 60.8% had no religion, 25.3% were Christian and 2.5% had other religions.

Of those at least 15 years old, 30 (15.4%) people had a bachelor's or higher degree, and 45 (23.1%) people had no formal qualifications. The median income was $29,000, compared with $31,800 nationally. 21 people (10.8%) earned over $70,000 compared to 17.2% nationally. The employment status of those at least 15 was that 102 (52.3%) people were employed full-time, 27 (13.8%) were part-time, and 3 (1.5%) were unemployed.

Education
The school was built on the present site in 1897.

Notes

External links
 Hikuai School

Thames-Coromandel District
Populated places in Waikato